Nyctemera maculata is a moth of the family Erebidae first described by Francis Walker in 1854. It is found on Java, Bali, Lombok and Flores.

Subspecies
Nyctemera maculata maculata (Java)
Nyctemera maculata variamacula de Vos, 2002 (Bali, Lombok, Flores)

References

Nyctemerina
Moths described in 1854